Terry Beckner Jr. (born March 2, 1997) is an American football defensive tackle for the Pittsburgh Maulers of the United States Football League (USFL). He played college football at Missouri. He was drafted by the Tampa Bay Buccaneers in the seventh round of the 2019 NFL Draft.

High school career
In Beckner's final season at East St. Louis, he recorded 107 tackles and 7 sacks.  He played in the 2015 Under Armour All-America Game.

College career
Beckner played as a true freshman at Missouri, and was named a Freshman All-American by Sporting News even though his season ended early after an MCL and ACL tear in his right knee against Brigham Young on November 14.  He had 27 total tackles, 8 being for loss, 3 sacks and a fumble recovery.

On January 20, 2016, Beckner was arrested during a traffic stop for possession of less than 35 grams of marijuana, a misdemeanor, while driving a Chrysler 300 through Columbia. The following day, Tigers head coach Barry Odom suspended Beckner indefinitely from the Missouri football team.

Before tearing his ACL in his left knee against Middle Tennessee, Beckner totaled 24 tackles, 2 being for loss, and a fumble recovery in the 2016 season.

Professional career
Beckner was drafted by the Tampa Bay Buccaneers in the seventh round, 215th overall, of the 2019 NFL Draft. On August 31, 2019, Beckner was waived by the Buccaneers and was signed to the practice squad the next day. He was suspended for four games by the NFL for violating the league's policy on performance-enhancing drugs on October 21, 2019. He was reinstated from suspension on November 18, 2019, and the Buccaneers released him from their practice squad.

Beckner had a tryout with the Chicago Bears on August 20, 2020. He was signed to the team's practice squad on September 29. He was released by the team on October 27.

Beckner signed with the Pittsburgh Maulers of the United States Football League on May 6, 2022, and he was subsequently transferred to the team's inactive roster. He was moved to the active roster on May 14. He was placed on injured reserve on June 1.

References

External links
 
 Missouri Tigers bio

1997 births
Living people
American football defensive tackles
Sportspeople from East St. Louis, Illinois
Under Armour All-American football players
Missouri Tigers football players
Players of American football from Illinois
Tampa Bay Buccaneers players
Chicago Bears players
Pittsburgh Maulers (2022) players